Phenylobacterium immobile is an aerobic, gram-negative, rod or coccoid-shaped (0.7 to 1.0 by 1.0 to 2.0 μm) bacteria that is non-motile and non-spore-forming. It is notable for degrading Chloridazon. Its type strain is E (= DSM 1986).

References

Further reading

External links

LPSN
Type strain of Phenylobacterium immobile at BacDive -  the Bacterial Diversity Metadatabase

Caulobacterales
Bacteria described in 1985